Joseph Burger (April 16, 1848 – January 2, 1921) was an Austrian German soldier who fought in the American Civil War. Burger received the United States' highest award for bravery during combat, the Medal of Honor, for heroism during combat at Nolensville, Tennessee on February 15, 1863, when Burger was 14 years of age. He was honored with the award on September 11, 1897.

Biography
Burger was born in Tyrol, Austria on April 16, 1848. He emigrated with his parents to the United States as an infant. He was orphaned at age 6, following the death of his parents from cholera. He enlisted into the 2nd Minnesota Infantry as a drummer boy at age 13.

He was commissioned a captain at age 16, becoming one of the youngest men to attain that rank during the Civil War.

He died in St. Paul on January 2, 1921, and his remains are interred at Oakland Cemetery in Minnesota. His grandson, Warren Burger served as Chief Justice of the United States from 1969 to 1986.

Medal of Honor citation

See also
 List of American Civil War Medal of Honor recipients: A–F

References

External links
 Joseph Burger, findagrave.com.  Portrait of Joseph Burger and photograph of gravestone.

1848 births
1921 deaths
American Civil War recipients of the Medal of Honor
Foreign-born Medal of Honor recipients
People of Minnesota in the American Civil War
Union Army soldiers
United States Army Medal of Honor recipients